is a Japanese former professional boxer who competed from 2003 to 2018. He is a world champion in two weight classes, having held the WBC featherweight title in 2009 and the WBC super-featherweight title from 2010 to 2012.

Professional career
Ao turned professional in September 2003 at the Korakuen Hall, Tokyo. In his debut Ao defeated fellow Japanese boxer Hiroshi Kashihara with a second round knockout.

Ao is managed by the Teiken Boxing Gym in Tokyo, and trains under Sendai Tanaka's guidance.  He has often attended Marco Antonio Barrera's training camp since 2003, because he was appreciated for his speed and heavy fists, and served as Barrera's chief sparring partner in August 2007.

After thirteen unbeaten fights, Ao beat Koji Umetsu for the Japanese featherweight title in March 2007.

Ao lost via split decision to champion Óscar Larios on 16 October 2008. Despite flooring Larios in the 4th round, Ao managed to lose a decision in the close and contested bout.

Fortunate for him, Ao got another chance at Larios' title on 12 March 2009. There, he applied more offensive tactics which resulted Larios dropping in the 12th round. Ao won the match by unanimous decision. On his first defense of the title held on July 14 that same year, Ao lost to Elio Rojas by unanimous decision.

Professional boxing record

See also
List of world featherweight boxing champions
List of world super-featherweight boxing champions
List of Japanese boxing world champions
Boxing in Japan

References

External links

 

1984 births
Living people
Japanese male boxers
World featherweight boxing champions
World super-featherweight boxing champions
World Boxing Council champions
People from Ichihara, Chiba
Sportspeople from Chiba Prefecture